KYDA (101.7 FM) is a radio station based in the Fort Worth, Texas, and is the local outlet of EMF's Air 1 radio, airing a Christian Worship format. The station is licensed to Azle, Texas, with a transmitter site located north of Decatur, Texas. It is currently owned by Educational Media Foundation after  purchase from Liberman Broadcasting in early November 2012.  Air1 is a Christian Worship music radio network in the United States.

History

Early beginnings
For the first three decades in operation, KDSX-FM was licensed for Denison-Sherman beginning on June 29, 1967. In late 1976, B.V. Hammond, Jr. and Lofton L. Hendrick sold the station to Grayson County Broadcasters, Inc., which sold the station the next year to Radiozark Broadcasters. As Radiozark did not buy its sister-station KDSX-AM radio (now KKLF in Richardson), it changed the callsign to KDSQ. The station ran a longtime Top 40/CHR format.

In the 1990s, KDSQ made a series of technical improvements, changing from class A to C3 in October 1991 and becoming a full class C station with 92 kW ERP from a transmitter northeast of Decatur in 1999. These improvements allowed the station to enter the Dallas-Fort Worth radio market. 

The station changed calls and formats multiple times throughout the 1990s. The station dropped its longtime CHR format in early 1993 and flipped to a country format but it only lasted for a few months. In July of that same year, both KDSQ and oldies station KTCY split formats. The split led KDSQ to flip to a hot adult contemporary format but downgraded towards a gold-based adult contemporary format a short time later. In late 1994, KDSQ dropped AC and flipped to a classic rock format, which didn't last long. After a short stint in January 1995, the station went silent. A few months later, the station returned back on the air and became KDVE with a soft adult contemporary format in mid-1995. In 1997, KDVE became KIKM-FM and flipped to a country station competing against KMKT, and two years later in 1999, the station became KZMP and changed its format to Spanish. Entravision Communications bought Z Spanish Media in 1999, resulting in its acquisition of KZMP. The callsign changed again in 2003, to KTCY.

Liberman Broadcasting (now Estrella Media as of February 2020) bought some of Entravision's radio assets on August 4, 2006 and relaunched KTCY "Concierto 101.7" as XO 101.7, retaining the same Spanish-language pop music but with different DJs and programming. The station moved toward a more romantic sound beginning in 2009.

In early 2012, KTCY briefly returned to Latin Pop as "Baila 101.7" [Baila is Spanish for "Dance"]. It competed for head-on with CBS Radio-owned KMVK Mega 107.5 and Univision Radio-owned KDXX Máxima 99.1. "Baila 101.7" previously broadcast music Sunday through Friday for a full 24 hours. However, on Saturday, 7-10 AM was reserved for Infomercials. The station ran jockless throughout its short tenure.

Acquisition by EMF
It was announced on November 5, 2012, that Educational Media Foundation, owner of Christian Contemporary K-LOVE and then Christian Rock Air1, would expand to the Dallas/Fort Worth area by purchasing KTCY from Liberman for $6 million. As Entercom-owned classic hits station KLUV 98.7 owns the "K-Love" branding in the Dallas/Fort Worth market, it was assumed that the station would take Air1 to avoid confusion. On February 8, the station went off the air to make way for EMF's takeover. EMF reserved the KYDA call letters for the current format that launched at 4 PM on February 12, 2013.

Signal
Unlike most of the area's FM stations like competitor KLTY, which transmit their signals from Cedar Hill, KYDA transmits its signal from an unincorporated area within the county borders of Cooke, Montague, and Wise. Therefore, KYDA's signal is much stronger in the Northwestern parts of the Dallas/Fort Worth metroplex as well as the cities of Decatur, Bowie, Gainesville, and Sherman, to as far north as Ardmore, Oklahoma, but is considerably weaker in Dallas and areas Southeast of the city itself.

References

External links

 DFW Radio/TV History

YDA
Radio stations established in 1967
Air1 radio stations
YDA
1967 establishments in Texas
Educational Media Foundation radio stations